Sondul Chapouk was a member of the Interim Iraq Governing Council created following the United States' 2003 invasion of Iraq. She was the only Turk and one of only three women in the council.

References
Members of the Iraqi Governing Council, BBC, July 14, 2003.
Robert Collier, "Iraqi ruling council takes over. Citizen Board: Appointed by U.S., 25 members face uphill battle for legitimacy," SF Gate, July 14, 2003: "A notable inclusion in the council were three women -- Songgul Chapouk, a member of the Turkish-speaking Turkmen minority in the north, Dr. Raja Habib Khuzai, the head of a maternity hospital in the southern city of Diwaniya, and Akila al-Hashimi, who was a top Iraqi diplomat until the fall of Hussein's regime and now has been named by U.S. officials to be Iraq's representative to the United Nations."
"Three Women Named to Iraq's Governing Council," Feminist Daily News Wire, July 14, 2003.
Mohammed A. R. Galadari, "A constitution for Iraqis sans discrimination," Khaleej Times, January 13, 2004.
Ashraf Khalil, "Women Call for Equal Representation in Iraq," WeNews, February 6, 2004.
"Bush, Arabs Disgusted Over Prisoner Abuse," Associated Press (Fox News), May 2, 2004.

Year of birth missing (living people)
Living people
Iraqi women's rights activists
21st-century Iraqi women politicians
21st-century Iraqi politicians